Periyanna is a 1999 Indian Tamil-language action drama film directed by S. A. Chandrasekhar, starring Suriya, Meena and Manasa with Vijayakanth in an extended cameo role. The soundtrack for this film was composed by debutant music director Bharani. The film released on 14 April 1999.

Plot
Suriya (Suriya), the main character, kills the villains who murder his family and had been sent to jail. During his time in jail, a well-respected minister celebrates his daughter's birthday in prison. His daughter is impressed by Suriya's talent in Violin percussion and convinces her father to grant her special permission to learn music from him. During this time, they fall in love with each other, and opposition grows from the girl's parents and the police department. Then, they elope. They come to a remote town where they witness the murder of a collector in the railway station during broad daylight, but no one seems to care. They then see that the man who murdered the collector is the chief of the village, Periyanna (Vijayakanth), so they try to oppose him. In their time at the village, they learn about his past and change their mind about him. He promises them to get them married. The movie then moves towards the climax as whether the village chief will be successful in getting those two lovers married or the girl's father will be successful in separating them by using the legal system against them.

Cast

Vijayakanth as Lingam/Periyanna (Extended Cameo Appearance)
Suriya as Suriya
Meena as Shenbagam
Manasa as Ganga
Devan as Varadharajan
Anandaraj
Manorama
Manivannan
R. Sundarrajan
Vinu Chakravarthy
Ajay Rathnam as Collector
O.A.K. Sundar
Sachu
Vaiyapuri as Prisoner
S. S. Chandran
Thalapathi Dinesh
Fight masters Ram & Lakshman
Rocky Rajesh as Henchman (special appearance)

Production
S. A. Chandrasekhar had initially planned to make the film with Vijayakanth and Vijay, but the project failed to materialise. The film re-emerged in 1998 with Vijay's busy schedules prompting Chandrasekhar to select Suriya to appear in a lead role alongside Vijayakanth. Meena was selected to play a leading role in the film. Chandrasekhar initially picked a model from Mumbai called Tanuja to be paired opposite Suriya, but later changed his mind. The role was handed to Manasa, sister of actress Easwari Rao, with the director changing her stage name to Manasa from Ganga as she was known in Kaakai Chiraginile. Vijayakanth's long-time assistant, S. K. Subbiah, produced the film, with Vijayakanth keen to work on the venture in order to help benefit Subbiah.

The film was launched in late 1998 with Vijayakanth, Suriya, director S. A. Chandrasekhar and veteran producers A. L. Azhagappan and Ibrahim Rowther in attendance. The film was predominantly shot at Chennai Film City.

Soundtrack

Bharani who earlier wrote lyrics for Vijay's debut film Naalaya Theerpu (1992) was selected to compose the music thus making his debut. The soundtrack contains 7 songs and lyrics for the songs were written by Bharani, Vasan, Arivumathi and Pulamaipithan. Actor Vijay had sung three songs for Suriya in this film with "Naam Dum Adikkira" song was well received while another song "Nilave Nilave" was also successful.

Release
The film released on 14 April 1999. It received negative reviews from critics and was a failure at the box office.

References

External links
 

Indian drama films
1999 films
1990s Tamil-language films
Films directed by S. A. Chandrasekhar